Tom Eddy Røymark (born 23 April 1950) is a Norwegian former professional ice hockey player. He played for the Norwegian national ice hockey team, and participated at the Winter Olympics in 1972 and 1980. He was Norwegian champion in 1977 and 1978.

During his career, Røymark played for Hasle/Løren IL, Frisk Asker and Manglerud Star Ishockey.

References

External links

1950 births
Living people
Ice hockey players at the 1972 Winter Olympics
Ice hockey players at the 1980 Winter Olympics
Norwegian ice hockey right wingers
Olympic ice hockey players of Norway
Ice hockey people from Oslo
Frisk Asker Ishockey players
Manglerud Star Ishockey players